Quince is a restaurant in the Jackson Square neighborhood in San Francisco, California. Opened in 2003 by chef Michael Tusk and his wife, Lindsay, in Pacific Heights, the restaurant moved to their current location in Jackson Square, which is next door to sister restaurant, Cotogna. The Tusks partner with Fresh Run Farms of Bolinas, CA in sourcing exclusive produce for a $275 per diner tasting menu in the California tradition. The restaurant also features a global selection of caviar.

In 2017, Quince became only the sixth restaurant in the San Francisco Bay Area to be awarded three Michelin stars by the Michelin Guide.

Awards

Quince was awarded one Michelin star in the debut San Francisco Bay Area Michelin Guide in 2007, a second Michelin star in 2014, and a third Michelin star in 2017. In 2011, the James Beard Foundation awarded Michael Tusk the James Beard Foundation Award Best Chef – Pacific for his cuisine at Quince. In addition, Tusk, along with Quince, have been nominated for the James Beard Award for Outstanding Service
in 2014 and James Beard Foundation Award for Outstanding Chef in 2016. Michael Bauer, the former restaurant critic for San Francisco Chronicle, awarded the restaurant four stars in 2015 and has included it in the Chronicle's annual Top 100 Restaurants.

See also
 List of Michelin 3-star restaurants
 List of Michelin 3-star restaurants in the United States

References

Restaurants in San Francisco
2003 establishments in California
Restaurants established in 2003
Michelin Guide starred restaurants in California